Peter Paul Busuttil (or Pietru Pawl Busuttil in Maltese) (1943-28 June 2017) was a Mayor of Hal Safi, Malta. He died on 28 June 2017 at the age of 74.

In 1986, Busuttil was accused of the murder of Raymond Caruana, a Nationalist activist after shots were fired towards the Nationalist Club of Gudja. It later transpired that Busuttil was framed by the Maltese police.

He was the first ever mayor of Safi and remained so for 18 years until recently when the other party won over the council. Busuttil worked in the council as a council member and helped to take care of his much-beloved home town, Safi.

References

1940s births
2017 deaths
Mayors of places in Malta
Year of birth missing
20th-century Maltese politicians
21st-century Maltese politicians
People from Safi, Malta